Black Rose (爆料黑玫瑰) is a MediaCorp Channel 8 Chinese language comedy-satire variety show. It is a remake of the Taiwanese show Celebrity Imitated Show (全民最大黨) and features various MediaCorp artistes acting as different characters with parodic mannerisms and names. Personalities and characters spoofed are often well-known figures in the Chinese language entertainment industry.

The show takes the format of a talk show, with one of the regular cast members or a guest star taking the role as host. The host holds a black rose and introduces the six other personalities one by one.

Five cast members made a guest appearance at the Star Search 2010 Grand Finals during the Q & A segment. It was hosted by Chew Chor Meng and featured some of their well-known characters.

The show returned for a second season on 7 April 2014. Michelle Chong did not return in this season, and her place was taken over by Vivian Lai.

Cast

Regular cast
Guo Liang
Quan Yi Fong
Marcus Chin
Dennis Chew
Michelle Chong (season 1)
Kym Ng
Vivian Lai (season 2)

Guests
Dasmond Koh (host, season 2)
Chen Hanwei
Lee Teng 
Henry Thia
Ben Yeo
Jeremy Chan
Jeffrey Xu
Brandon Wong

Personalities spoofed
Edison Chen and the 2008 photo scandal
Kym Ng
Rui En
Chen Hanwei
Kumar
Yueniang (Jeanette Aw) and Liu Yidao (Yao Wenlong) from The Little Nyonya
Genie (Fiona Xie) from My Genie
Phua Chu Kang (Gurmit Singh)
Confucius
Nezha
S.H.E
Pauline Lan
Tsai Chin
The Little Tigers
Chang Fei
Fei Yu-ching
Chow Yun-fat
The "Na'vi" from Avatar
Oprah Winfrey
Jackie Chan
Angelina Jolie
Ris Low

Accolades
The show won several nominations at the 2011 Star Awards.

External links
Official Website

2010 Singaporean television series debuts
2010 Singaporean television series endings
Singaporean television series
Channel 8 (Singapore) original programming